Helena Maria de Jesus Águas (born 16 June 1956), commonly known as Lena d'Água, is a Portuguese singer.

Biography
Lena d'Água was born in Lisbon. In 1973 she enrolled briefly in Sociology but, as the 25 April 1974 Carnation Revolution came to fruition, she left university and joined a theatre group, later majoring in Education. 

In 1975, d'Água married Ramiro Martins, the bass player of The Beatnicks. The couple had a daughter and, in May of the following year, she joined the band as lead singer, divorcing and leaving the project in 1978. Being the first woman in the country to lead a pop rock band, she became a sex symbol and a pop star; after singing with the Beatnicks and Salada de Frutas she pursued a solo career with her band Atlântida, whose first three solo albums were produced by England's Robin Geoffrey Cable. 

Lena d'Água was a heroin addict for about nine years, but nevertheless she never left music and became clean in 1998. She sang Billie Holiday and Elis Regina with Portuguese jazz musicians, with whom she would later record a live album singing Portuguese classics from the 70's and 80's at the Hot Clube in 2005. Her album Carrossel was recorded in 2013, with a rock and roll power trio called Rock and Roll Station, with whom she recovered her pop-rock hits from the 80s. Her latest Desalmadamente was released in 2019 and brought her back to original songs, all composed by Pedro da Silva Martins.

Personal life
D'Água is the daughter of S.L. Benfica star José Águas, who played for the club in the 1950s and 1960s. Her younger brother, Rui, represented it three decades later, and both appeared for the Portuguese national team.

In 2011, d'Água wrote a book about her father, titled «José Águas, o meu pai herói» («José Águas, my hero father»).

Discography

1978 – Ascenção e Queda (Petrus Castrus)
1979 – Qual é Coisa, Qual é ela?
1979 - "O Nosso Livro/Cantiga da Babá" (single)
1980 – Sem Açúcar (Salada de Frutas)
1981 – "Robot/Armagedom" (Salada de Frutas single)
1980 – "Vígaro cá, vígaro lá/Labirinto" (single)
1982 – Perto de ti
1983 – "Papalagui/Jardim Zoológico" (single)
1984 – Lusitânia
1986 – Terra Prometida
1987 – Aguaceiro
1989 – Tu Aqui
1992 – Ou Isto ou Aquilo
1993 – As Canções do Século
1996 – Demagogia (greatest hits)
1996 – O Melhor de Lena d'Água – Sempre Que o Amor Me Quiser (greatest hits)
2007 – Sempre – Live at Hot Clube de Portugal
2011 – Lena d'Agua & Banda Atlântida (Bandas Míticas compilation, 14)
2014 – Carrossel
2019 – Desalmadamente

References

External links
Official blog 

1956 births
Living people
Singers from Lisbon
20th-century Portuguese women singers
21st-century Portuguese women singers